John James Taylor (born 3 April 1979) is a former Australian cricketer.

Career 
Taylor played several matches for Western Australia during the 2003–04 season. From Melbourne, Taylor played his early cricket in Victoria, representing the state's under-19s and second XI teams. Prior to the 2002–03 season, he moved to Western Australia, hoping to gain selection at senior level. Taylor made his limited-overs debut for Western Australia in the ING Cup in early November 2003, and his Pura Cup debut shortly after. A right-handed all-rounder, he was regularly selected in both formats of the game during the 2003–04 season, playing first-class matches and eight limited-overs matches. Taylor's best bowling figures, 4/70, came against Victoria in late November 2003, while his highest first-class score (and only half-century) was an innings of 50 runs against New South Wales in late January 2004. However, at the end of the season he returned to Victoria for family reasons, despite having been offered a full contract from the Western Australian Cricket Association (WACA) for the following season. Taylor did not play at state level again, but did play one match for a Victorian Invitation XI against the touring New Zealanders in December 2004.

See also
 List of Western Australia first-class cricketers

References

1979 births
Australian cricketers
Living people
Cricketers from Melbourne
Western Australia cricketers